The Ben Franklin Free-For-All Pace is harness racing stakes race for older Standardbred pacers run annually since 2007 at Pocono Downs in Wilkes-Barre, Pennsylvania.

Historical race events
Boulder Creek set a new track record time of 1:48 3/5 in winning the 2007 inaugural race.

Sweet Lou, the 2011 winner of the Dan Patch Award for Two-Year-Old Male Pacer, won the 2013 Ben Franklin FFA Pace in which he set a new track and World Record for a 5/8 mile track with a time of 1:47 flat.

In 2016, Always B Miki equaled Sweet Lou's World Record time in winning the June 25, 2016  Ben Franklin FFA Pace elimination race. He came back to win the July 2 final in exactly the same World Record time.

Records
 Most wins by a driver
 3 – Tim Tetrick (2007, 2008, 2010)

 Most wins by a trainer
 2 – Jimmy Takter (2010, 2016) & Ron Burke (2013, 2014)

 Stakes record
 1:47 0/0 – Sweet Lou (2014) - new World Record
 1:47 0/0 – Always B Miki (2016) - equaled World Record

Ben Franklin Free-For-All Pace winners

References

External links
Always B Miki winning the June 25, 2016 Ben Franklin Free-For-All Pace elimination
YouTube video of  Always B Miki winning the July 2, 2016 Ben Franklin Free-For-All Pace final

Harness racing in the United States
Horse races in Pennsylvania
Recurring sporting events established in 2007
Sports in the Scranton–Wilkes-Barre metropolitan area
2007 establishments in Pennsylvania